HMS L54 was a late-model L-class submarine built for the Royal Navy during the First World War. The boat was not completed before the end of the war and was sold for scrap in 1939.

Design and description
L52 and its successors were modified to maximise the number of 21-inch (53.3 cm) torpedoes carried in the bow. They displaced  on the surface and  submerged. The L-class submarines had a crew of 44 officers and ratings.

For surface running, the boats were powered by two 12-cylinder Vickers  diesel engines, each driving one propeller shaft. When submerged each propeller was driven by a  electric motor. They could reach  on the surface and  underwater.

The boats were armed with six 21-inch torpedo tubes in the bow. They carried eight reload torpedoes for a grand total of a dozen torpedoes. They were also armed with two  deck guns.

Construction and career
HMS L54 was laid down on 14 May 1917 by William Denny at their Dumbarton shipyard and launched on 20 August 1918. She was then towed to HM Dockyard, Chatham, for completion on 27 August 1924. The boat was sold for scrap on 2 February 1939 at Pembroke Dock.

Notes

References
 
 
 
 

 

British L-class submarines
Ships built on the River Clyde
1919 ships
World War I submarines of the United Kingdom
Royal Navy ship names